Kavak is a Mexican company that operates an online marketplace for used cars. With a valuation of $8.7 billion, Kavak was the second most valuable unicorn in Latin America as of September 2021. Kavak is based in Mexico City.

History 
Kavak was founded in Mexico in 2016.

In August 2020 Kavak launched in Argentina.

In October 2020, Kavak became the first unicorn in Mexico when its valuation exceeded one billion US dollars.

In January 2021, the company raised $485 million in a financing round, increasing its valuation to $4 billion.

In May 2021, Kavak launched its financing arm, Kavak Capital.

In July 2021, the company announced its expansion into Brazil. US$500 million will be invested for this purpose. This will be the second foreign market the company enters. 

In September 2021, the company raised $700 million in another financing round, doubling its valuation to more than $8 billion. Investors included Sea, SoftBank, Peter Thiel's Founders Fund, Tiger Global and others.

References 

Mexican companies established in 2013
Companies based in Mexico City
Used car market
Online marketplaces of Mexico